The 2023 Houston Christian Huskies softball team represents Houston Christian University during the 2023 NCAA Division I softball season. The Huskies play their home games at Husky Field and are led by thirty-first year head coach Mary-Ellen Hall. They are members of the Southland Conference.

Preseason

Southland Conference Coaches Poll
The Southland Conference Coaches Poll was released on January 26, 2023. Houston Christian was picked to finish fifth in the Southland Conference with 58 votes.

Preseason All-Southland team
Two Houston Christian players were named to the Southland Conference preseason second team.

First Team
Crislyne Moreno (MCNS, SO, 1st Base)
Caleigh Cross  (MCNS, SR, 2nd Base)
Jil Poullard (MCNS, JR, 3rd Base)
Maddie Watson (SELA, SO, Shortstop)
Bailey Krolczyk (SELA, JR, Catcher)
Kaylee Lopez (MCNS, SR, Utility)
Audrey Greely (SELA, JR, Designated Player)
Laney Roos (NSU, JR, Outfielder)
Alayis Seneca (MCNS, SR, Outfielder)
Cam Goodman (SELA, JR, Outfielder)
Ashley Vallejo (MCNS, JR, Pitcher)
Bronte Rhoden (NSU, SR, Pitcher)

Second Team
Sydney Hoyt (TAMUCC, JR, 1st Base)
Madison Rayner (SELA, SR, 2nd Base)
Haylie Savage (HCU, SO, 3rd Base)
Ryleigh Mata (UIW, SO, Shortstop)
Tristin Court (NSU, JR, Catcher)
Melise Gossen (NICH, SR, Utility)
Chloe Gomez (MCNS, JR, Designated Player)
Alexa Poche (NICH, JR, Outfielder)
Makenzie Chaffin (NSU, JR, Outfielder)
Bailie Ragsdale (NSU, SO, Outfielder)
Lyndie Swanson (HCU, JR, Pitcher)
Siarah Galvan  (TAMUCC, SO, Pitcher)

Roster

Schedule and results

Schedule Source:*Rankings are based on the team's current ranking in the NFCA/USA Softball poll.

References

Houston Christian
Houston Christian Huskies softball
Houston Christian Huskies softball